Corgan is a surname. Notable people with the surname include:

Billy Corgan (born 1967), American musician, singer-songwriter, and wrestling promoter
Jack Corgan (died 2000), American architect
Mike Corgan (1918–1989), American football player
Richard Corgan (born 1978), Welsh actor